.realtor is an active generic top-level domain (gTLD) intended for real estate brokers who are members of the National Association of Realtors or the Canadian Real Estate Association. The registry for .realtor is run by Real Estate Domains (RED). The sole registrar of .realtor domains is Real Estate Domains LLC.

See also
National Association of Realtors 
Realtor.com
Real property

References

External links
 Website for the .Realtor TLD

Realtor